Émile Lesage (February 8, 1904 – July 27, 1963) was a Canadian politician from Quebec.

Background
He was born on February 8, 1904, in Louiseville, Mauricie and was a business person.

Member of the legislature
Lesage ran as a Conservative candidate in the 1935 election for the district of Abitibi, but was defeated by Liberal incumbent Hector Authier.  He was elected as a Union Nationale candidate in the 1936 election.  He lost his bid for re-election in the 1939 election.

Legislative Councillor
He was appointed to the Legislative Council of Quebec in 1956 and represented the division of Montarville until his death.

Mayor
Lesage served as Mayor of Macamic, Quebec, from 1958 to 1961.

Death
He died on July 27, 1963.

Footnotes

1904 births
1963 deaths
Mayors of places in Quebec
Union Nationale (Quebec) MLCs
Union Nationale (Quebec) MNAs